Matthew "Ted" Guinan (October 14, 1910 – March 22, 1995) was an Irish labor organizer who served as the second president of Transport Workers Union of America (TWU).

Born in County Offaly, Ireland, he immigrated in 1929. He took a job as a trolley operator in 1933. In 1943, after six years as an unpaid volunteer organizer, he became a full-time organizer for TWU Local 100.

He was able to negotiate a 40-hour work week for public and private bus workers. He became International Executive Vice President in 1952 and International Secretary Treasurer in 1956, and was re-elected in 1961 and 1965.

Following a bitter New York City transit strike (for which Guinan and other leaders spent nine days in jail after refusing to call it off), President Mike Quill died at age 60, and Guinan succeeded his longtime friend. Guinan held the post of International President until his retirement on May 1, 1979.

Political activism

Guinan walked with Martin Luther King Jr. in the 1965 Selma to Montgomery marches in Alabama, and he committed the union's resources of money and manpower to the cause for equality.

As an AFL-CIO Vice President, he served on their Civil Rights Committee. His activism landed him on the master list of Nixon political opponents.

Cardinal John Joseph O'Connor presided over Guinan's 1995 funeral at St. Patrick's Cathedral, New York.

References

Staff report (June 28, 1973). Lists of White House 'Enemies' and Memorandums Relating to Those Named. New York Times
Stout, David (March 24, 1995). Matthew Guinan, 84, Dies; Led Transit Union. New York Times

1910 births
1995 deaths
Trade unionists from New York (state)
Irish emigrants to the United States
AFL–CIO people
Activists from New York City
American trade unionists of Irish descent
Transport Workers Union of America people
Catholics from New York (state)